Mohd Faerul Talib (born ) is a Malaysian male weightlifter, competing in the 69 kg category and representing Malaysia at international competitions. He competed at world championships, most recently at the 2007 World Weightlifting Championships. He participated at the 2010 Commonwealth Games in the 69 kg event.

Major competitions

References

1986 births
Living people
Malaysian male weightlifters
Place of birth missing (living people)
Weightlifters at the 2010 Commonwealth Games
Commonwealth Games competitors for Malaysia
21st-century Malaysian people